Elanjikal John Jacob was a member of 3rd, 4th and 5th Kerala Legislative Assembly. He was from Kerala Congress party and represented Thiruvalla constituency.

Positions held
He was Minister for Food and Civil supplies from 11-04-1977 to 25-04-1977 and from 27-04-1977 to 26-09-1978.
He served Merchant navy as Officer from 1927 to 1940 and commissioned officer in Indian Army from 1942 to 1944. He expired on 26-09-1978, while serving as Minister.

References

Kerala politicians